The 1994 CONCACAF Champions' Cup was the 30th edition of the annual international club football competition held in the CONCACAF region (North America, Central America and the Caribbean), the CONCACAF Champions' Cup. It determined that year's club champion of association football in the CONCACAF region and was played from 12 December 1993 till 5 February 1994.

The teams were split in 2 zones (North/Central and Caribbean). The North/Central zone was split in 3 groups, qualifying the best team of each to the final stage. The winner of the Caribbean zone got the qualification too. All qualifying matches in the tournament were played under the home/away match system, while the final tournament was played in San Jose, California, U.S..

Costa Rican club Cartaginés beat Mexican team Atlante in the final, becoming CONCACAF champion for the first time in their history.

North and Central American Zone
 The winner of each group advanced to the Final Round.

Group 1
Preliminary Round

 Comunicaciones advanced to First Round.

First Round

 Petrotela and Cartaginés advanced to Second Round.

Second Round

 Cartaginés advanced to CONCACAF Final Tournament.

Group 2
Preliminary Round

|}
Aurora advance to the First round.

First Round

|}
Aurora and Alianza advance to the Second round.

Second Round

|}
Alianza F.C. advances to the CONCACAF Final tournament.

Group 3
Preliminary Round

|}
Herediano advance to the First round.

First Round

|}
Atlante and Herediano advance to the Second round.

Second Round

|}
Atlante advances to the CONCACAF Final tournament.

Caribbean Zone
Preliminary Round

|}
SV Robinhood and SV Leo Victor advance to the First round.

First Round

|}
Racing Gonaïves withdrew before 1st leg.*
Parham withdrew before 2nd leg, awarded 0–2 against them**
All clubs in BOLD advance to the Second round.

Second Round

|}
All clubs in BOLD advance to the Third round.

Third Round

|}
CRKSV Jong Colombia and Union Sportive Robert advance to the Fourth round.

Fourth Round

|}
Union Sportive Robert advances to the CONCACAF Final tournament.

Final round bracket

Semifinals

Third Place Match

Final

Champion

References

CONCACAF Champions' Cup
1
c